Wein, Weib und Gesang (Wine, Woman, and Song), Op. 333, is a Viennese waltz by Johann Strauss II. It is a choral waltz in its original form, although it is seldom heard in this version today. It was commissioned for the Vienna Men's Choral Association's so-called Fools' Evening on 2 February 1869 with a dedication to the Association's honorary chorus-master Johann Herbeck. Its fanciful title was drawn from an old adage: "Who loves not wine, women and song remains a fool his whole life long."

The waltz's admirers include the famous opera composer Richard Wagner and Strauss' good friend Johannes Brahms. There is an arrangement for piano, harmonium and string quartet by Alban Berg.

The waltz's primary home key is in E-flat major, with its introduction interpolating with B-flat major as well as B major. The first waltz melody, with its tapping quality is quintessentially Viennese in nature. Further waltz themes alternate between lush passion and good-humored cheekiness, ending with a swirling finish in the principal home key underlined by a brass fanfare and snare drumroll, as is the usual style of concluding a piece in Strauss' works dating around that period.

The title is also a German expression for having fun.

Waltz 1

References 

Waltzes by Johann Strauss II
1869 compositions